= Featherstone Fork, Virginia =

Unincorporated community in Virginia, United States

Coordinates: 38°12′06″N 77°19′45″W

Featherstone Fork is an unincorporated community in Caroline County, in the U.S. state of Virginia.
